The King Alfred Chair of English Literature was founded at the University of Liverpool, England in 1881. It was one of the original endowments of the University, funded by William Rathbone and his brothers Samuel and Phillip Rathbone. The early history of the chair was as follows: King Alfred Chair of Modern History and Literature, 1881–82; Modern Literature and History, 1882-1884; Modern Literature and English Language, 1884-1900.

King Alfred Professors of English Literature
The holders of the chair have been:

1881–1889: A.C. Bradley
1890–1900: Sir Walter Raleigh
1901–1925: Oliver Elton
1929–1951: Leonard Martin
1951–1974: Kenneth Muir FBA
1974–1990: Philip Edwards FBA
1991–2003: Sir Jonathan Bate CBE FBA
2004–2010: Neil Corcoran
2020–present: Gregory Lynall

References

External links
University Chairs and their Holders Past and Present: Faculty of Arts

University of Liverpool
Professorships in literature
1881 establishments in England